The Accrediting Bureau of Health Education Schools (ABHES) is a recognized higher education accreditation organization in the United States specializing in the institutional accreditation of private, postsecondary institutions that offer allied health education programs, and the programmatic accreditation of programs leading to associate degrees or certificates in the medical assistant, medical laboratory technician and surgical technology fields. The ABHES is the only healthcare education accrediting agency that is recognized by the U.S. Department of Education. In addition to recognition by the U.S. Department of Education, the ABHES is also recognized by the American Association of Medical Assistants (AAMA), the American Medical Technologists (AMT) and the Liaison Council for Certification of Surgical Technologists (LLC-ST).

ABHES-accredited schools
 ACT College
 American Career College
 Brookline College
 City College - Florida 
 ECPI
 The College of Health Care Professions
 Fortis College - select campuses
 Pima Medical Institute
 Ross Medical Education Center
 Stratford University

References

External links
 Accrediting Bureau of Health Education Schools official website

School accreditors
Health education in the United States